Långträsk is a village (småort) in the Swedish Piteå Municipality. It got a train station in 1893, but there are no passengers being transported anymore. The village had 101 inhabitants in 2015

Near the village is the Länsväg 373.

The village has a station on the train line Boden – Bräcke.

References

Populated places in Norrbotten County